Pease is an unincorporated community in Laclede County, in the Ozarks of southern Missouri. Pease is located along the Osage Fork Gasconade River, just upstream of the Missouri Route J crossing and the confluence of Parks Creek with the Osage Fork.

History
A post office called Pease was established in 1885, and remained in operation until 1921. The community has the name of George Pease, a pioneer citizen.

References

Unincorporated communities in Laclede County, Missouri
Unincorporated communities in Missouri